Paranormal is the second studio album by American rapper Prozak. It was released April 24, 2012, and marked rapper's second full-length release on Strange Music. The album featured guest appearances from Tech N9ne, Twiztid, Krizz Kaliko, and Sid Wilson of heavy metal band Slipknot. The record has appeared on multiple charts, debuted at #90 on Billboard 200, #15 on Top R&B/Hip-Hop Albums, #8 on Top Rap Albums and #15 on Top Indie Albums chart.

Track listing

References

2012 albums
Strange Music albums
Prozak (rapper) albums